Kobodo is a settlement in Kenya's Nyanza Province.

References 

Populated places in Nyanza Province